Robert Chao Romero (born 1972) is a Chinese-Latino American historian and immigration lawyer at UCLA. He is the author of The Chinese in Mexico, 1882-1940, winner of the Latin American Studies Association's Latina/o Studies Section Book Award.

Biography
Romero was the maternal-grandson of the Chinese evangelist Calvin Chao (Zhao Junying, 1906–1996), who Christianity Today called as “the Chinese Billy Graham.” Romero's father was from Chihuahua, Mexico and his mother is from Hubei, China.

He received his Bachelor of Arts in History at UCLA in 1994 and his Juris Doctor at UC Berkeley in 1998, following a Doctor of Philosophy in Latin American History at UCLA in 2003. His first monograph, The Chinese in Mexico, 1882-1940, investigates the history of the Chinese community in Mexico, which receives the Latina/o Studies Section Book Award from the Latin American Studies Association.

He is currently Associate Professor at the Chicana/o and Central American Studies, UCLA. His research mainly examines Asian immigration to Latin America. Due to his background as an attorney, he is also interested in immigration law and policy.

He is the co-founder of Jesus 4 Revolutionaries, a Christian ministry to activists, and the co-chair of the Matthew 25 Movement in Southern California. He was ordained in the early 2000s by Faye Newman in South Los Angeles.

Selected works 

 Brown Church: Five Centuries of Latina/o Social Justice, Theology, and Identity. Grand Rapid:IVP, 2020. 
 The Chinese in Mexico, 1882-1940. Tucson: The University of Arizona Press, 2010.

References

Living people
University of California, Los Angeles alumni
UC Berkeley School of Law alumni
University of California, Los Angeles faculty
American people of Chinese descent
American people of Mexican descent
1972 births
Historians from California